Witthawat Sailam (born February 20, 1999) is a Thai professional footballer who plays as a midfielder for Thai League 1 club Chiangrai United.

References

External links
 

1999 births
Living people
Witthawat Sailam
Association football midfielders
Witthawat Sailam
Witthawat Sailam
Witthawat Sailam